Gerhard Kleppinger (born 1 March 1958) is a German football manager and former player who last managed SV Sandhausen.

References

External links

1958 births
Living people
German footballers
Association football midfielders
Germany under-21 international footballers
Bundesliga players
2. Bundesliga players
SV Darmstadt 98 players
Hannover 96 players
Karlsruher SC players
FC Schalke 04 players
Borussia Dortmund players
KFC Uerdingen 05 players
German football managers
SV Darmstadt 98 managers
FC St. Pauli managers
Olympic footballers of West Germany
West German footballers
Footballers at the 1988 Summer Olympics
Olympic bronze medalists for West Germany
Olympic medalists in football
FC Gütersloh 2000 managers
Rot-Weiß Oberhausen managers
2. Bundesliga managers
SV Sandhausen managers
Medalists at the 1988 Summer Olympics
Footballers from Hesse
FSV Frankfurt managers